The discography of Funeral for a Friend consists of seven albums, seven EPs, eighteen singles, two DVDs and numerous compilation appearances.

Albums

Studio albums

Extended plays

Live albums

Compilation albums

DVDs

Singles

B-sides

Music videos
While not all of these songs were released as singles, promotional videos were filmed for them and shown in the UK.

"The Art of American Football"
"10.45 Amsterdam Conversations"
"This Year's Most Open Heartbreak"
"Juneau"
"She Drove Me to Daytime Television"
"Bullet Theory"
"Escape Artists Never Die"
"You Want Romance?"
"Juneau (Acoustic)"
"Streetcar"
"Monsters"
"History"
"Roses for the Dead"
"Into Oblivion (Reunion)"
"Walk Away"
"The Great Wide Open"
"Waterfront Dance Club"
"Beneath the Burning Tree"
"Kicking and Screaming"
"Rules and Games"
"Wrench"
"Serpents In Solitude"
"Front Row Seats to the End of the World"
"Sixteen"
"Broken Foundation"
"Spinning Over the Island"
"Best Friends & Hospital Beds"
"The Distance"
"Nails"
"1%"
"Pencil Pusher"
"Streetcar (Hours / Live At Islington Academy DVD)"

References

Rock music group discographies
Discographies of British artists